In the Community of Christ, the Council of Twelve Apostles is one of the governing bodies in the church hierarchy. They are disciples who hold the priesthood office of apostle, and are responsible for the evangelistic witness of the church. Apostles are also high priests in the Melchizedek priesthood of the church.

Calling

As with all priesthood in the Community of Christ, members of the Council of Twelve are considered to be "called by God." The Prophet-President "receives" the call, and after consultation with the other two members of the First Presidency, "presents" the call to the candidate. If the candidate accepts, the candidates name is presented to the World Conference and the call is sustained by majority vote. New apostles are ordained in a special worship service held during the World Conference. Prior to the Presidency of W. Grant McMurray, the call of apostles and other members of presiding quorums of the church were named in an "inspired document" that was added to the scriptures of the church in the Doctrine and Covenants. McMurray and others believed that the lengthy passages related to priesthood calls reduced the readability of the Doctrine and Covenants. Since that time, these priesthood calls have been presented in a separate document that is not included in the Doctrine and Covenants. Most appointee ministers live in the Independence, Missouri, area, however, the current trend is to base apostles in the field. Each apostle has an office in the Independence Temple and they share administrative staff.

Responsibilities
Individual apostles may be assigned to various responsibilities of church leadership, including field administration. Together with the First Presidency and the Presiding Bishopric, this council is a part of the "World Church Leadership Council." Each of the apostles is called to serve as a "special witness of the gospel", and each is appointed by the First Presidency to oversee one or more of the church's mission fields. In recent years, some members of the Council are also given responsibility for certain areas of program ministry. If for any reason the First Presidency is dissolved or otherwise unable to preside over the World Conference, the Council of Twelve Apostles presides over the conference until such time as the First Presidency resumes functioning or is reorganized. Assigned by the First Presidency, they carry major responsibility for church expansion, and serve as administrative supervisors of field jurisdictions. The Council of Twelve Apostles elects one of its members to serve as President of the Council of Twelve and another member to serve as Secretary of the Council of Twelve. Members of the Council of Twelve Apostles are normally full-time paid ministers, called "Appointee Ministers" in the Community of Christ.

Members of the Council of Twelve Apostles directly supervise Mission Center Presidents and missionaries holding the priesthood office of Seventy. They have the authority to call Mission Center Conferences and frequently preside over certain portions of the various conferences. Apostles usually initiate calls to the offices of high priest and evangelist, often in consultation or at the behest of Mission Center Presidents. Apostles usually hold annual or semi-annual meetings of the appointee ministers and key staff members in their fields. Apostles have the authority to organize or dissolve congregations and ministry groups. If a Mission Center President takes over operation of a congregation (usually only in situations of extreme dissent), an appeal of this decision may be made to the apostle that supervises that field. Apostles typically travel to missionary fields around the world, even when they have fields entirely within the United States. This international missionary experience is believed to enrich both the recipients of the ministry as well as the experience of the apostles' themselves. Most jurisdictions of the Community of Christ hold summertime family camps called "reunions." Apostles usually spend much of their summer attending various reunions.

Progressive influence
The Council of Twelve Apostles has long been regarded as the primary advocates for the growing international presence of the church and its international witness of Jesus Christ. In addition, the Council has frequently strived to lead the church towards progressive stances on issues such as homosexuality, women in the priesthood, open communion, ecumenism, interfaith dialogue, environmentalism, peace and justice ministries. Former apostle Charles D. Neff (1958–1984) led the Council of Twelve in developing relativistic viewpoints towards both ritual and doctrine in order to make the gospel relevant across cultures. Presently, the Council contains five female apostles, an African, a Polynesian and a Honduran.

Current members
The current members of the Council, their specific assignments, and year they joined the Council are as follows:

David H. M. Nii – South Central USA Mission Field (2019)
Bunda C. Chibwe – Central and West Africa Mission Field; South-Central Asia Mission Field (2000)
Ronald D. Harmon Jr. – President, Council of Twelve; Western USA and Baja California Mexico Mission Field (2005)
Catherine C. Mambwe – West, South, and East Africa Mission Field (2019)
Carlos Enrique Mejia – Central and South America Mission Field (2007)
Mareva M. Arnaud Tchong – Pacifikasia Mission Field (2013)
Barbara L. Carter – Southeast USA Mission Field (2013)
Richard C. N. James – Eurasia Mission Field (2013)
Arthur E. Smith – Canada Mission Field; Caribbean and Mexico-Texas Field (2013)
Janné C. Grover – Central USA Mission Field (2016)
Robin K. Linkhart – North Central USA Mission Field (2016)
Lachlan E. Mackay – Northeast USA Mission Field (2016)

1844 to present

This is a list of the members of the Council in the Community of Christ, (formerly the Reorganized Church of Jesus Christ of Latter Day Saints) ordained after 1844. The dates are the years they served as a member of the Council of Twelve.

Notes

References
The Doctrine and Covenants of The Church of Jesus Christ of Latter-day Saints Containing Revelations Given to Joseph Smith, the Prophet, with Some Additions by his Successors in the Presidency of the Church, Intellectual Reserve: Salt Lake City, UT, 1981.
Book of Doctrine and Covenants: Carefully Selected from the Revelations of God and Given in the Order of their Dates, Herald Publishing House: Independence, MO, 2000.

Latter Day Saint hierarchy
Apostles of the Community of Christ
Religious organizations established in 1835
1835 establishments in the United States